The Bavarian Class D X engines were saturated steam locomotives of the Royal Bavarian State Railways (Königlich Bayerische Staatsbahn). 

The locomotives, which were built by Krauss were similar to the Class D VIII, but were smaller and lighter. Like the D VIII they had a trailing axle, that was connected to the final coupled axle by a Krauss-Helmholtz bogie.

In 1890 the first six were built, followed in 1893 by three more with somewhat larger wheels. The first engine was only 8,880 mm long due to the lack of a coal bunker on the driver's cab. 

All the vehicles were taken over by the Deutsche Reichsbahn-Gesellschaft in 1925 as DRG Class 98.77 and remained in service until 1931. Only numbers 98 7706 and 98 7707 were retired shortly after the renumbering.

See also 
 Royal Bavarian State Railways
 List of Bavarian locomotives and railbuses

References

0-6-2T locomotives
D 10
Standard gauge locomotives of Germany
Krauss locomotives
Railway locomotives introduced in 1890
C1′ n2t locomotives